John Thomas "Doc" Redmon (January 4, 1892 – December 17, 1949) was an American football player and coach. He served as the head football coach at the South Dakota School of Mines in 1921. He also served as the school's athletic director during the 1921–22 academic year.

Redmon played college football at Indiana University and professionally for the Wabash Athletic Association and Pine Village Athletic Club

References

External links
 

1892 births
1949 deaths
American football centers
American football guards
American football tackles
Indiana Hoosiers football players
South Dakota Mines Hardrockers athletic directors
South Dakota Mines Hardrockers football coaches
People from Frankfort, Indiana
Players of American football from Indiana